Teddy Bill (born Hans Günter Leo Kern; 18 November 1900 – 11 February 1949) was an Austrian actor. Later in his career he was also credited as Teddy Kern.

Selected filmography

 Princess Trulala (1926) - Lackei
 Vienna - Berlin (1926) - Ein Heurigenfänger
 The Boxer's Bride (1926) - Heinz Gordon
 The Sea Cadet (1926)
 Marie's Soldier (1927)
 The Imaginary Baron (1927) - Hans v. Grabow
 Durchlaucht Radieschen (1927) - Pueblo de Santa Galantos
 The Eighteen Year Old (1927) - Paul Malot
 Students' Love (1927) - Teddy
 Das Fürstenkind (1927) - Trottulos
 The Most Beautiful Legs of Berlin (1927)
 Svengali (1927) - Maler Leard
 Der König der Mittelstürmer (1927) - Mr. Jonas
 Only a Viennese Woman Kisses Like That (1928) - Der Bäcker
 Artists (1928) - Ralph, Milsons Freund
 It Attracted Three Fellows (1928)
 When the Guard Marches (1928)
 Honeymoon (1928)
 Love's Masquerade (1928) - Herr im Auto
 Two Red Roses (1928) - Georg
 Only a Viennese Woman Kisses Like That (1928) - Karl
 Polish Economy (1928) - Windig
 The First Kiss (1928) - Präsident des Anny-Cord-Clubs
 Tales from the Vienna Woods (1928) - Fritz Pampfinger
 Serenissimus and the Last Virgin (1928) - Teddy, Reporter
 The Abduction of the Sabine Women (1928) - Friedrich Wilhelm, Strieses Aeltester
 Nachtgestalten (1929)
 Sinful and Sweet (1929) - Gaston - Willings' Freund
 Inherited Passions (1929)
 Come Back, All Is Forgiven (1929) - Teddy, ihr Sohn
 Im Prater blühen wieder die Bäume (1929) - Johann
 Only on the Rhine (1930) - Houp, Barrymores Bursche
 Two Worlds (1930) - Tschech. Soldat (German Version)
 Two Worlds (1930) - Tschechischer Soldat
 The Singing City (1930) - Heini Ladenburg / Claires Verehrer
 Eine Freundin so goldig wie Du (1930)
 The Big Attraction (1931) - Tommy
 The Theft of the Mona Lisa (1931)
 Children of Fortune (1931)
 Ein süsses Geheimnis (1931) - Johan
 Die Wasserteufel von Hieflau (1932)
 Die Vier vom Bob 13 (1932) - Leopold
 Teilnehmer antwortet nicht (1932) - Police Student
 Today Is the Day (1933)
 Abenteuer am Lido (1933)
 Voices of Spring (1933)
 Her Highness Dances the Waltz (1935)
 Die heimliche Gräfin (1942)
 It's Only Love (1947)
 The Singing House (1947)
 The Heavenly Waltz (1948)
 Lambert Feels Threatened (1949)

External links

1900 births
1949 deaths
Austrian male film actors
Austrian male silent film actors
Male actors from Vienna
20th-century Austrian male actors